The Bishop of Tinnevelly was  the Ordinary of the Anglican Church in Tinnevelly from its inception in 1896 until the foundation of the Church in India, Pakistan, Burma and Ceylon in 1927; and after that head of one of its Dioceses.

References 

Anglican bishops of Tinnevelly
1896 establishments in British India